The Cabombaceae are a family of aquatic, herbaceous flowering plants. A common name for its species is water shield.  The family is recognised as distinct in the Angiosperm Phylogeny Group IV system (2016).  The family consists of two genera of aquatic plants, Brasenia and Cabomba, totalling six species.

The Cabombaceae are all aquatic, living in still or slow-moving waters of temperate and tropical North and South America, Europe, Asia, Africa, and Australia. Although found on all continents but Antarctica, the plants tend to grow in relatively restricted ranges.

The family has an extensive fossil record from the Cretaceous with plants that exhibit affinities to either the Cabombaceae or Nymphaeaceae occurring in the Early Cretaceous. One such likely Cretaceous member is the genus Pluricarpellatia, found in rocks 115 million years old in what is now Brazil.

The APG system of 1998 included this family in the water lily family Nymphaeaceae, as did the APG II system, of 2003 (optionally). The APG III and APG IV systems of classification separated the family Cabombaceae from the family Nymphaeaceae. The family is part of the order Nymphaeales, which is one of the most basal flowering plant lineages.

References

 Simpson, M.G. Plant Systematics. Elsevier Academic Press. 2006.

External links

Nymphaeales
Angiosperm families